Jonai Science College,(In Assamese জোনাই বিজ্ঞান মহাবিদ্যালয় ) established in 2001, is a major and general degree college situated at Udaipur, Jonai, Assam. It offers bachelor's degree courses in science, Art's and Commerce . This college is affiliated with the Dibrugarh University.

Departments

Science
Physics
Chemistry
Mathematics
Anthropology
Computer Science
Botany
Zoology

References

External links
jonaisciencecollege.edu.in

Universities and colleges in Assam
Colleges affiliated to Dibrugarh University
Educational institutions established in 2001
2001 establishments in Assam